"Only You" is the second single from Teddy Pendergrass's 1978 album, Life Is a Song Worth Singing. It was released on September 2. The song peaked at #29 on the Dance Charts and #22 on the R&B Charts. In the UK, "Only You" was double-sided release along with Close the Door, where it went to #41.

Popular culture
Eddie Murphy alluded to the song during his Delirious standup routine.

References

Teddy Pendergrass songs
1978 singles
1978 songs
Philadelphia International Records singles
Songs written by Kenny Gamble
Songs written by Leon Huff